Leaf Rapids Airport  is located  north of Leaf Rapids, Manitoba, Canada.

See also
Leaf Rapids Water Aerodrome

References

Registered aerodromes in Manitoba